Shah Abdur Razzak is a Bangladesh Awami League politician and the former Member of Parliament of Rangpur-4.

Career
Razzak was a veteran of the Bengali Language movement and Bangladesh Liberation war. He was elected to parliament from Rangpur-4 as a Bangladesh Awami League candidate in 1986.

Death
Razzak died on 13 March 2018 in Rangpur City, Rangpur District, Bangladesh.

References

Awami League politicians
2018 deaths
3rd Jatiya Sangsad members
Mukti Bahini personnel